"Float On" is a song by American rock band Modest Mouse, released on March 8, 2004, as the lead single from their fourth studio album, Good News for People Who Love Bad News (2004). The song topped the US Billboard Modern Rock Tracks chart and was nominated for a Grammy Award for Best Rock Song in 2005. The music video is portrayed in the style of a pop-up book with the band wearing turn of the century style clothing and in an underwater scene with flotsam suits.

Background and composition
Asked about the song in an interview with The A.V. Club, Brock said that he consciously intended to write something that felt more positive than some of his previous work:

The song is in the key of F major with a tempo of 101 beats per minute. The final few notes of "The World at Large" lead into the opening notes of "Float On".

Release and reception
The song was released to alternative radio on March 8, 2004, and was the first Modest Mouse song to gain mainstream popularity. Nearly six months after its release, it became the band's first  1 hit on the US Billboard Modern Rock Tracks chart. It debuted on the Billboard Hot 100 at No. 70 and peaked at No. 68. In Australia, the song peaked at No. 94 and was ranked No. 11 on Triple J's Hottest 100 of 2004. In 2013, when Triple J created a new list of the Hottest 100 songs of the past 20 years, Float On appeared at No. 45. In July 2009, it was also voted in at No. 94 in the Triple J Hottest 100 of All Time. In December 2009, Rolling Stone named it the 39th greatest song of the 2000s. NME ranked it at No. 351 on their list of the "500 Greatest Songs of All Time" in 2014. At the 47th Annual Grammy Awards in 2005, "Float On" was nominated for Best Rock Song, losing to U2's "Vertigo".

Track listings

US 7-inch and CD single
 "Float On" – 3:28
 "I've Got It All (Most)" – 3:06

Australian CD single
 "Float On" – 3:28
 "I've Got It All (Most)" – 3:06
 "The Good Times Are Killing Me" (alternative mix version) – 4:11
 "Bukowski" (Congleton/Godbey remix) – 4:14

UK 7-inch single
A. "Float On"
B. "Bukowski" (Congleton/Godbey remix)

UK enhanced CD single
 "Float On" – 3:28
 "I've Got It All (Most)" – 3:06
 "The Good Times Are Killing Me" (alternative mix version) – 4:11
 "Float On" (video) – 3:32

European enhanced maxi-single
 "Float On" – 3:28
 "I've Got It All (Most)" – 3:06
 "The Good Times Are Killing Me" (alternative mix version) – 4:11
 "Bukowski" (Congleton/Godbey remix) – 4:14
 "Float On" (video)

Personnel
 Isaac Brock – vocals, lead guitar
 Eric Judy – bass, backing vocals
 Dann Gallucci – rhythm guitar, keyboards, drum loops, backing vocals
 Benjamin Weikel – drums, percussion

Charts

Weekly charts

Year-end charts

Certifications

Release history

Covers
The song was covered by Ben Lee, whose version can be heard on the soundtrack for the 2006 film John Tucker Must Die.

It was also covered by Mark Kozelek and Goldspot, whose version later appeared on the television series The O.C.

The band Iron Horse did a bluegrass cover version of the song in a 2007 album entitled The Bluegrass Tribute to Modest Mouse: Something You've Never Heard Before as a part of their "Pickin' On" series.

The song's melody was sampled by Lupe Fiasco in 2010 for the song "The Show Goes On".

References

2004 singles
2004 songs
Epic Records singles
Modest Mouse songs
Songs written by Dann Gallucci
Songs written by Eric Judy
Songs written by Isaac Brock (musician)